Pachymantis bicingulata is a species of praying mantis found in Malaysia, Sumatra, Java, and Borneo.

References

Mantidae
Insects of Asia
Insects described in 1911